The 1996 season was the Hawthorn Football Club's 72nd season in the Australian Football League and 95th overall.

Fixture

Premiership season

Finals series

Ladder

References

Hawthorn Football Club seasons